The 1989–90 Iowa Hawkeyes men's basketball team represented the University of Iowa as members of the Big Ten Conference. The team was led by fourth-year head coach Tom Davis and played their home games at Carver-Hawkeye Arena. They finished the season 12–16 overall and 4–14 in Big Ten play.

Roster

Schedule and results

|-
!colspan=8 style=| Non-Conference Regular Season

|-
!colspan=8 style=| Big Ten Regular Season

Rankings

Team players in the 1990 NBA Draft

References

Iowa Hawkeyes
Iowa Hawkeyes men's basketball seasons
1989 in sports in Iowa
Hawk